Canzonissima '68 is an album by Italian singer Mina, released in 1968.

The album is a collection of songs previously published on 45rpm records (except for "E sono ancora qui"). All the songs were performed during the TV show Canzonissima 1968. The tracks "Zum zum zum" and "Vorrei che fosse amore" were the theme songs for the same show.

Track listing

Side A

Side B

1968 albums
Mina (Italian singer) albums
Italian-language albums